The Silas Jacob N. Beeks House, located near Forest Grove, Oregon, is listed on the National Register of Historic Places. Jacob Beeks travelled with his wife to Oregon and built this house in multiple stages starting with the first part in 1848. About twelve years later he would finish the addition. He and his family remained in the house until 1899 when they sold it to a Dutch settler who was the father of Martin Bernards who would go on to establish one of the first trucking companies in Oregon. They then moved to live with their Son in Klickitat County, Washington.

Architecture 
The house is designed in a Gothic style including the addition that was added later. It has "Downing style" aspects including the color of the paint which was determined to be "Downing Yellow"

See also
 National Register of Historic Places listings in Washington County, Oregon

References

External links

Article with pictures of interior and exterior:
" https://www.oregonlive.com/life-and-culture/g66l-2019/10/dc51d93a045182/preservation-awards-salute-old-fire-station-reuse-pioneer-farmhouse-restoration-10-others-before-after-photos.html

1848 establishments in Oregon Territory
Buildings and structures in Forest Grove, Oregon
Carpenter Gothic architecture in Oregon
Gothic Revival architecture in Oregon
Houses completed in 1848
Houses in Washington County, Oregon
Houses on the National Register of Historic Places in Oregon
National Register of Historic Places in Washington County, Oregon